Lackawanna County Courthouse is a historic courthouse building located in Scranton, Lackawanna County, in the U.S. state of Pennsylvania.

Courthouse
The courthouse was built in 1884, and is a 3 1/2-story rectangular masonry building, with a raised basement, in the Romanesque Revival-style. It was enlarged in 1896, with the addition of a third story and reconstruction of the roof to add a number of eclectic design elements. It features a five-story clock tower. A courthouse wing was built in 1964. The courthouse was the site of the first session of the 1902 Anthracite Coal Strike Commission.

Along with the monument to John Mitchell, the building was added to the National Register of Historic Places in 1997.

John Mitchell Monument

The monument to John Mitchell (1870–1919) was erected in 1924. It consists of a granite monolith with a niche, enclosing a bronze statue of Mitchell.

See also
 List of state and county courthouses in Pennsylvania

References

External links

Lackawanna County, Pennsylvania website

County courthouses in Pennsylvania
Courthouses on the National Register of Historic Places in Pennsylvania
Romanesque Revival architecture in Pennsylvania
Government buildings completed in 1924
Government buildings completed in 1884
Buildings and structures in Scranton, Pennsylvania
National Register of Historic Places in Lackawanna County, Pennsylvania